Roger Leland Wollman (born May 29, 1934) is a Senior United States Circuit Judge and former Chief Judge of the United States Court of Appeals for the Eighth Circuit. He is the older brother of Harvey L. Wollman, former Governor of South Dakota.

Early life and education

Born in Frankfort, South Dakota, Roger's parents were Edwin J. Wollman (1907–1981) and Katherine (Kleinsasser) Wollman (1905–2002). His ancestors were ethnic Germans living in Russia and Wollman grew up Mennonite. He attended Doland High School. Wollman received a Bachelor of Arts degree from Tabor College in 1957. He was in the United States Army from 1957 to 1959. He then attended the University of South Dakota School of Law, graduating magna cum laude in 1962 with a Juris Doctor. In 1964, he received a Master of Laws from Harvard Law School.

Early career

Wollman began his career as a judicial law clerk to Judge George T. Mickelson of the United States District Court for the District of South Dakota from 1962 to 1963. He was in private practice of law in Aberdeen, South Dakota, from 1964 to 1971, and served as a State's attorney of Brown County, South Dakota, (in Aberdeen) from 1967 to 1971. Wollman served for fifteen years on the Supreme Court of South Dakota, including as chief justice from 1978 to 1982.

Federal judicial service

Wollman was nominated by President Ronald Reagan on June 25, 1985, to the United States Court of Appeals for the Eighth Circuit, to a new seat created by 98 Stat. 333. South Dakota senior senator Larry Pressler worked with the White House to secure this nomination, and recommended Wollman as a conservative judge. He was the first South Dakotan on that court in 25 years. Wollman was confirmed by the United States Senate on July 19, 1985, and he received his commission on July 22, 1985. From 1999 to 2002, Wollman served as Chief Judge. Wollman maintains his chambers in Sioux Falls, South Dakota.

Among his judicial law clerks that worked under him include Ron A. Parsons Jr. and his successor Jonathan A. Kobes.

On February 9, 2018, Wollman notified President Donald Trump that he intended to step down as an active judge no later than the end of 2018. He assumed senior status on December 14, 2018, upon the confirmation of his successor and former clerk, Jonathan A. Kobes.

Cases
 United States v. Neil Scott Kramer

References

Sources
 

1934 births
20th-century American judges
American Mennonites
American people of German-Russian descent
Chief Justices of the South Dakota Supreme Court
Harvard Law School alumni
Judges of the United States Court of Appeals for the Eighth Circuit
Living people
Military personnel from South Dakota
People from Spink County, South Dakota
Politicians from Sioux Falls, South Dakota
South Dakota lawyers
Justices of the South Dakota Supreme Court
United States court of appeals judges appointed by Ronald Reagan
University of South Dakota School of Law alumni